Rest on Me is the first studio album by Kim Carnes. It was released in 1971 (see 1971 in music) on Amos Records and reissued on A&M Records in the late 1970s. The album (minus the opening song) was also released on CD on many European budget labels in the early 1990s - but with all tracks remixed and, rather curiously, running at a markedly low speed. Most tracks were also lengthened, simply by repeating parts of the tracks. In 2012, the original album was re-mastered and made available, complete and at the correct speed, as an internet download in 2012 and on CD on the Essential Media Group label the following year.

Background
Carnes began her recording career with The New Christy Minstrels. After meeting producer Jimmy Bowen in 1971, she signed a recording contract with Amos Records. Following the album's release, Carnes and her husband David Ellingson issued a standalone single titled "It's Love That Keeps It All Together", also produced by Bowen.

Critical reception

Cash Box described "To Love" as "an interesting up tempo tune in a highly commercial vein", and a "fine performance" by Carnes. They described Rest on Me as a "fabulous album", noting Carnes' ability to interpret songs well. Billboard noted the album's similarities with artists including Carole King, Carly Simon and Gayle McCormick, adding that Carnes is "distinctive in her own right".

Track listing

Personnel
Adapted from the album liner notes.

 Kim Carnes – lead vocals
 Larry Muhoberac – piano, organ, arrangements
 Larry Carlton – guitar
 Mike Deasy – guitar
 James Burton – guitar
 Bill Perry – bass
 Reinie Press – bass
 Ed Greene – drums
 Dennis St. John – drums
 Dave Ellingson – backing vocals
 Etham Goya – backing vocals
 Brooks Hunnicutt – backing vocals
 Danny Jimms – backing vocals 
 Peter Morse – backing vocals
 Mike Settle – backing vocals
 Glen Hardin – piano 
 Gil Rogers – guitar

Technical
 Jimmy Bowen – producer
 John Guess – engineer

Design
 Bruce Hinton – art direction
 Ken Kim – graphics, photography
 Kim Carnes – liner notes

Release history

References

1971 debut albums
Kim Carnes albums
Albums produced by Jimmy Bowen